ECTRA may refer to:
 Eastern Competitive Trail Ride Association (see competitive trail riding)

Ectra may refer to:
 Echtra